Aleksandar Trifunović may refer to:
Aleksandar Trifunović (basketball) (born 1967), Serbian basketball coach and former player
Aleksandar Trifunović (footballer) (born 1954), Serbian footballer